The 1902–03 Drexel Blue and Gold men's basketball team represented Drexel Institute of Art, Science and Industry during the 1902–03 men's basketball season. The Blue and Gold, who played without a head coach, played their home games at Main Building.

Roster

Schedule

|-
!colspan=9 style="background:#F8B800; color:#002663;"| Regular season
|-

References

Drexel Dragons men's basketball seasons
Drexel
Drexel
Drexel